The Spirit of Rett is a streamlined car designed to challenge the wheel-driven land speed record. On September 21, 2010 it made two speed runs piloted by Charlie Nearburg at the Bonneville Salt Flats. The average speed of approximately  exceeded the 45 year old Summers brothers’ Goldenrod record. The “Spirit of Rett” now has the fastest single engine car record in history.

The car was named after Nearburg's son who died in 2005.

Accomplishments
(Source:)

 Fastest single engine car record in history 414.316 MPH as of September 21, 2010 (and only 3 mph less than the absolute fastest "real car" record of 417.020 MPH held by Tom Burkland)
 Fastest normally aspirated car in history (Broke 45-year-old record set by Summer's Bros. "Goldenrod" on Nov 12, 1965)
 First and only unblown single engine car over 400 MPH
 First and only car to ever set two over 300 MPH records in one day
 First and only car to ever hold all four of the fastest unblown records at Bonneville at the same time  A/FS 379.6 MPH,  A/GS 353.825 MPH,  AA/GS 368.136 MPH,  AA/FS 392.503 MPH
 First and only car to ever hold the two fastest unblown FIA records at the same time
 At the 2011 FIA Landspeed Shootout held in September, the “Spirit of Rett” increased its FIA  Category A, Group II, Class 10  record  to 366.59 MPH.

The only over 400 MPH records that have been set by conventional race cars are as follows (per Tom Burkland):
 Tom Burkland "Burklands 411" 417.020 MPH SCTA AA/BFS (two engines, blown, fuel, 4wd) Oct, 2004
 Charles Nearburg "Spirit of Rett" 414.316 MPH FIA (one engine, unblown, fuel, 2wd) Sept 21, 2010
 Nolan White "Spirit of Autopower" 413.156 MPH SCTA AA/BFS (blown, fuel) Aug, 2002
 Al Teague "Speed-O-Motive" 409.86 MPH FIA (one engine, blown, fuel, 2wd) Aug, 1991
 Bob Summers "Goldenrod" 409.277 MPH FIA (four engines, fuel, 4wd) Nov 12, 1965
 George Poteet "Speed Demon" 404.562 SCTA D/BFS (one engine, blown, fuel, 2wd) Aug 19, 2010
 Donald Campbell "Bluebird CN7" 403.10 FIA July, 1964

References

External links
 Video: Charles Nearburg Breaks 45 year old Record at Bonneville
 Video: Spirit of Rett driver Charles Nearburg at Bonneville 2011
 Video: Where They Raced - Charlie Nearburg
 Video: Spirit of Rett land speed record (down run)
 Video: World's Fastest Car: Spirit of Rett World Record at Bonneville Salt Flats
 Video: Spirit of Rett return run push-off

Wheel-driven land speed record cars
Streamliner cars